Reincidentes is a Spanish rock/punk rock band. They were formed in the 1980s as Incidente Local, by Manuel Pizarro on drums, Juan Barea on guitar, and Fernando Medina on bass and vocals. They performed their first live concert in 1987 at University of Seville. After they became finalists at a local rock contest and were joined by sax player José Luis Nieto, they recorded their self-titled debut album in 1989 released by '"Discos Trilita". After signing up to the "Discos Suicidas" label and participating in Seville Expo '92, they started touring Central America. Later, Selu left the band and Finito de Badajoz became the new guitarist. In 1997, the band signed to BMG and shortly thereafter their live album Algazara became their first gold record in Spain in 2000.

History 
Reincidentes came into being through the Sevillian rock band Incedente Local, which was active their city's music scene between 1985 and 1986. Later on, its members became involved in the student protests of 1987, playing at the University of Seville, that had been occupied by students.

After this, Reincidentes recorded at Juanjo Pizarro's studios. The demo that came out of the studio was used to participate in a rock concert promoted by Seville's Deputation in 1989, where they were finalists.

Since then, Reincidentes has grown and developed their personality, turning into one of the most social rock bands in Andalucia and Spain.

Their most known songs are Andalucía entera (dedicated to the village, Marinaleda), La historia se repite, Camela-3 (which criticised the manipulation of information, directly attacking the TV station Antena 3), Vicio, Hablando con mi cerebro, Un pueblo (about the basque conflict, with the collaboration of Fermín Muguruza) and Ay Dolores (dedicated to women that suffered from domestic abuse, which includes a flamenco chorus).

Their work is a reflection of their left wing ideology, shown in songs such as Sáhara adelante (supporting Western Sahara), México levanta (in support of the Zapatista movement), La republicana (in support of the Spanish Republic), and Resistencia (supporting the Cuban Revolution). Some of their songs, such as Andaluces Levantaos (a version of the Andalusian anthem) and Jornaleros andaluces, address Andalusian topics. On their album América: canciones de ida y vuelta, they cover various bands and Latin-American solo artists, a variety of them identifying with protest music and left wing ideas. The group has participated in numerous editions of the historic PCE party.

Reincidentes are not only against not pirating in the music industry, but are in favour of it, describing it as “very beneficial” for musicians and authors, believing that less known and less commercial bands can reach a broader audience. This makes setting up concerts a much easier task, which in their opinion is where musicians really make money.

Members
Manuel J. Pizarro Fernández: drums.
Fernando Madina Pepper: bass and vocals.
Juan M. Rodríguez Barea: guitar and vocals.
Javi Chispes: guitar and vocals. 
Carlos Domínguez Reinhardt: sound technician.
Apart from the usual members, the band has had guest collaborators on some of their songs by musicians such as Rosendo, Juanjo Pizarro, Enrique “el Drogas” of Barricada, Mohamed of Mägo de Oz, Kutxi Romero of Marea, Iván Jiménez "el Flaco" of Out'n outers, Robe Iniesta of Extremoduro, Evaristo of La Polla Records and Gatillazo o Fermín Muguruza, of Kortatu and Negu Gorriak.

One of the members, José Luis Nieto "Selu", who played the saxophone, left the band in 1993 and was replaced by Finito de Badajoz on the guitar, which changed the group's sound. Selu died in 2020.

In February 2021 the band announced that Finito de Badajoz was leaving the band after 27 years together to explore new fields artistically and personally. Shortly after the band announced that he will be replaced by Javi Chispes (Maniática, Banda Jachís), with whom they had collaborated before.

Discography
Reincidentes. Discos Trilita, 1989, reedited by Discos Suicidas.
Ni un paso atrás. Discos Suicidas, 1991.
¿Dónde está Judas? Discos Suicidas, 1992.
Sol y Rabia. Discos Suicidas, 1993.
Nunca es tarde... si la dicha es buena. Discos Suicidas, 1994.
Materia Reservada. Discos Suicidas, 1997.
¡Te lo dije!. BMG Ariola/RCA, 1997.
Los Auténticos. Discos Suicidas, 1998.
Algazara, BMG Ariola/RCA, 1998.
¿Y ahora qué? BMG Ariola/RCA, 2000.
La otra orilla. La otra orilla, 2001.
Cosas de este mundo. Locomotive Music, 2002.
Acústico. Locomotive Music, 2004.
El comercio del dolor. Locomotive Music, 2005.
Dementes. Locomotive Music, 2006.
América: Canciones de ida y vuelta, Realidad Musical, 2008.
Tiempos de ira, Maldito Records, 2011.
Aniversario, 2013.
Awkan Haciendo hablar Al Silencio, 2015.
Vergüenza, 2017

References

External links
Official web page (in Spanish)
Reincidentes on allmusic.com

Spanish punk rock groups